Blizzard Mountain is a  mountain summit located on the common border shared by Blaine County and Butte County in Idaho, United States.

Description
Blizzard Mountain is part of the Pioneer Mountains which are a subset of the Rocky Mountains. The mountain is situated immediately northwest of Craters of the Moon National Monument and Preserve, 24 miles southwest of the town of Arco, and can be seen from Highway 20. This landform's toponym has been officially adopted by the United States Board on Geographic Names.

See also
 List of mountain peaks of Idaho

References

Gallery

External links
 Blizzard Mountain: Idaho: A Climbing Guide
 National Geodetic Survey Data Sheet
 Blizzard Mountain: weather forecast

Mountains of Idaho
Mountains of Blaine County, Idaho
Mountains of Butte County, Idaho
North American 2000 m summits